Public schools in the United States of America provide basic education from kindergarten until the twelfth grade. This is provided free of charge for the students and parents, but is paid for by taxes on property owners as well as general taxes collected by the federal government. This education is mandated by the states.  With the completion of this basic schooling, one obtains a high school diploma as certification of basic skills for employers.

The largest source of funding for elementary and secondary education comes from state government aid, followed by local contributions (primarily property taxes).
The public education system provides the classes needed to obtain a General Education Development (GED) and obtain a job or pursue higher education. The education system can deem higher level courses unnecessary, therefore omitting these courses from public school curriculum. Though earning a diploma, students' education can be limiting, and most of the disadvantaged population includes those in a lower income city or neighborhood. Racial and ethnic minorities primarily comprise this population. As Kozol talks about in his book, Racial Inequality, school infrastructure and the surrounding neighborhoods play a big factor in funding allocation. Frequently, students drop out due to lack of support from parents or school faculty.

According to a review of the economics literature by Kirabo Jackson, there is strong evidence of "a causal relationship between increased school spending and student outcomes. All but one of the several multi-state studies find a strong link between spending and outcomes – indicating that money matters on average... the robustness of the patterns across a variety of settings is compelling evidence of a real positive causal relationship between increased school spending and student outcomes on average."

The National Center for Education Statistics reports that approximately 80% of school funding in years 2000-01, 2010–11, 2016-17 was dedicated to salaries and employee benefits. Salaries decreased by 7% and benefits spending Increased by 6% from 2000-01 to 2016-17.

Current expenditures per pupil enrolled in the fall in public elementary and secondary schools were 20 percent higher in 2016–17 than in 2000–01 ($12,794 vs. $10,675, both in constant 2018–19 dollars). Current expenditures per pupil increased from $10,675 in 2000–01 to $12,435 in 2008–09, decreased between 2008–09 and 2012–13 to $11,791, and then increased to $12,794 in 2016–17.

Capital outlay expenditures per pupil in 2016–17 ($1,266) were 10 percent lower than in 2000–01 ($1,412). Interest payments on public elementary and secondary school debt per pupil were 22 percent higher in 2016–17 than in 2000–01. During this period, interest payments per pupil increased from $312 in 2000–01 to $415 in 2010–11, before declining to $379 in 2016–17 (all in constant 2018–19 dollars).

State and local role in education funding 
According to the US Department of Education, the Federal Government contributes about 8% to funding US public schools. To fund the remaining balance per student in the public education System, state and local governments are mandated to allocate money towards education. The state allocates a percentage of its revenue, from sales and income tax, to use towards education. The funds that are set aside for education are determined by the State constitutions, Propositions, and the incoming Government officials. According to the National Conference of state Legislatures, States provide structure, equality, fiscal accountability, stability and support to the public education systems per state. Each state varies the level of support that the schools receive with the implementation of legislation.

The Local government allocates education funding from the revenue generated by property tax and other fundraising efforts. Local officials have the ability to influence the rate of change of property taxes that are used to fund local expenditures, including education.

Due to the varied levels of income throughout states and within local communities, education funding suffers from inequalities where some communities have excessive funding and others are lacking important resources to support students. According to the research on Equity and Adequacy in School Funding, “much of the current litigation and legislative activity in education funding seeks to assure “adequacy”, that is, a sufficient level of funding to deliver an adequate education to every student in the state.” There are key factors in which states receive more funding, teacher salaries, employee benefits, cost of living, class sizes, and demographics. For example, Utah has the lowest state funding due to their demographics, and the fact that the state of Utah can not afford to let the average costs rise due to its immense young demographic, which is one in five residents attend public school. New York, on the other hand, has the highest ranking expenditures, twenty thousand per student including teacher salaries, and the cost of living, which is significantly higher than other states.

There have been people protesting to change the amount of funding that schools get. One lawsuit has been going on from mid December 2021 to now (March 2022) to raise the amount of funding the Government gives to schools in Pennsylvania started by the Pennsylvania Association of Rural and Small Schools (PARSS).

Educational resource inequality 

Because income and tax revenue varies so widely from district to district, the current school funding model has led to a huge disparity in the funding that schools in different parts of a single state receive. Primarily, schools in affluent areas receive more funding as compared to those located in low-income areas. Overall, this model presents a challenge to schools situated in low-income areas because performance measures can be tied to this funding approach. Low-income areas have comparatively lower property and income taxes hence affecting the funding of the schools. Poor school performance in low-income areas has a direct causal relationship with the low income and property taxes hence the need for a change in the approach to funding. A solution to the identified problem is to distribute wealth evenly to allow better funding models for public schools. Derisma (2013) claimed that “using state taxes to fund public education has the potential to create funding insecurities. To begin, state tax revenues are largely generated from income and sales taxes. Income and sales tax revenue are not stable sources and have the propensity to drop in times of recession” (p. 122). The claim shows that funding insecurities in low-income areas are likely to inconvenience those living in those areas and children in school face the same issue.

On average, 8% of revenues are federal, 47% from the state, and 45% locally sourced. Since 2008, states have reduced their school funding from taxes by 12%, the most pronounced drop on record. The majority of targeted school funding reforms have been in response to court orders, often due to lawsuits.  Despite some efforts to improve school funding, 60% of schools report that their facilities need repair.

School funding in the United States is unequal.  Twenty-three states send more funding to their wealthiest districts; Pennsylvania sends 33% less to their high-poverty districts. Only 1/5th of states spend more money on their neediest schools, half as many as did in 2008. Despite receiving more money from the federal government, the majority of districts with Title 1 schools see unequal funding for staff and even less money for non-staff costs. Minority students are disproportionately impacted as white students attend low-income schools 18% of the time versus 60% of the time for black and Hispanic students. At the same time as funding levels have dropped and remained inequitable, the number of school fundraising organizations, such as Parent Teacher Associations, have risen by 230%, form 990 filings required for revenues above $25,000 have increased by 300%, and total revenues have increased by 347.7% to 880 million and low-poverty school districts receive a much greater level of these voluntary donations.

Inadequate school funding has a disproportionate impact on low-income students and high-poverty schools. 14% of 4th graders at poor schools were at or above proficient in reading and 17% at math while in low poverty schools, more than twice as many were at proficiency or above in reading and 60% were for math. Additionally, graduation rates for high poverty schools are 68% compared to 91% for other schools, then the rate of college attendance is 28% versus 52%. Low-income children are a full year behind by 14, and the total achievement gap between the richest and poorest 10% has grown by 30-40% in 25 years.

Increasing school revenues by 10% would lead to an average of more years of education completed, future wage earnings increasing by 7.25%, and 3.67% less future poverty each year.  For low-income students the impacts would be even greater as the amount of education completed increases almost twice as much and the future impacts include 9.5% higher adult wages and 6.8% lower poverty rates. A 25% increase in school funding would result in a complete elimination of the achievement gap between low and high income students. Raising teacher pay not only results in a better overall quality and effectiveness of teachers, but also reduces the high school dropout rate.

References 

Education finance in the United States